Leyton  is an English surname. Notable people with the surname include:

 Drue Leyton born Dorothy Blackman, (1903–1997), American actress and member of the French Resistance
 Elliott Leyton (born 1939), Canadian social-anthropologist, educator and author
 George Leyton (born Henry Hackett; 1864–1948), U.S.-born British entertainer and actor
 John Leyton (born 1936), English actor and singer
 Richard Leyton (born 1987), Chilean footballer
 Sebastián Leyton (born 1993), Chilean footballer

See also
 Layton (surname)

English-language surnames